Ulagam Pirandhadhu Enakkaga is a 1990 Indian Tamil-language action comedy film, directed by S. P. Muthuraman and produced by M. Saravanan and Balasubramanian. The film stars Sathyaraj, Gautami, Rupini and Saranya. Art director Salam won the Tamil Nadu State Film Award for Best Art Director.

Plot 
Raja is a rich person who returns to India from America. He gets surprised when most of them call him by different names and later he sees another lookalike of himself, Quarter Govindan, who is a jobless guy and wanted to earn money for his sister's life. Raja requests Quarter Govindan to pretend like him so that he will be able to find his enemies.

Cast 

Sathyaraj as Raja and Quarter Govindan
Gautami
Rupini
Saranya as Quarter Govindan sister
Srividya as Quarter Govindan mother
Cho Ramaswamy
Goundamani as Sutthi Josiyar
 Senthil
Manorama
Disco Shanthi
Lalitha Kumari
K. S. Jayalakshmi
Padma
Jai Ganesh
Dileep
Rami Reddy (voice dubbed by Naasar)
Chinni Jayanth
Charle
Loose Mohan
Oru Viral Krishna Rao
Typist Gopu
Kumarimuthu
Kullamani

Soundtrack 
The songs were composed by R. D. Burman and the background music score by S. P. Balasubrahmanyam, with lyrics by Vairamuthu. The song "Thiruttu Poonai Eruttu Velai" reuses the tune of the song "Reshmi Zulfen Nashili Aankhen" from Indrajeet.

Reception
P. S. S. of Kalki called it a film that has been cleverly made in the pursuit of collection by catering to the weaknesses to be enjoyed.

References

External links 
 

1990 films
1990 action comedy films
1990s Tamil-language films
AVM Productions films
Films directed by S. P. Muthuraman
Films scored by S. P. Balasubrahmanyam
Films with screenplays by Chitralaya Gopu
Indian action comedy films